Hanamkonda Assembly constituency is a former assembly constituency of Andhra Pradesh Legislative Assembly in Telangana state of India, then part of united Andhra Pradesh. During 2009 delimitation exercise the constituency was bifurcated into Warangal West and Warangal East. This constituency was created in 1978 originally from the earlier united Warangal (Assembly constituency) and existed between 1978 and 2009 elections.

Election results

References

Former assembly constituencies of Telangana
Hanamkonda district
Warangal district